Singampunari is a revenue block in the Sivaganga district of Tamil Nadu, India. It has a total of 30 panchayat villages.

Demographics
 India census, Singampunari had a population of 16,415. Males constitute 50% of the population and females 50%. Singampunari has an average literacy rate of 71%, higher than the national average of 59.5%: male literacy is 78%, and female literacy is 65%. In Singampunari, 11% of the population is under 6 years of age.

References

See also 
 Singampunari

Cities and towns in Sivaganga district